= Grand Master of the Martial Arts =

Grand Master of the Martial Arts is a 1981 card game published by Wind Warrior Co.

== Gameplay ==
Grand Master of the Martial Arts is a card game in which players use cards to gain mastery of 15 unarmed martial arts.

== Reception ==
Ronald Pehr reviewed Grand Master of the Martial Arts in The Space Gamer No. 53. Pehr commented that "Grand Master is [..] exciting, entertaining, and attractive to wargamers, role-players, budding martial artists, and anyone else willing to try it."
